Treat Him Right is the debut studio album released by American country artist Barbara Mandrell. The album was released September 9, 1971, on Columbia Records and was produced by Billy Sherrill. It contained a series of singles Mandrell had released between 1969 and 1970 and would be the first of a series of albums recorded at the Columbia label.

Background and content
Treat Him Right was recorded between May 1969 and April 1971 at the Columbia Recording Studio in Nashville, Tennessee, United States. The album contained 11 tracks. The album's tracks had a country soul sound and included covers of R&B songs such as Otis Redding's "I've Been Loving You Too Long (To Stop Now)" and Aretha Franklin's "Do Right Woman, Do Right Man". Allmusic's Al Campbell reviewed the double compilation release of Treat Him Right and The Midnight Oil and considered Treat Him Right to not only have an apparent Country-soul sound, but also included "an interesting combination of pop, country, and soul." It also featured a cover version of Joe South's "The Games People Play". The album's producer, Billy Sherrill wrote two songs for the album: "He'll Never Take the Place of You" and "Playin' Around with Love". Treat Him Right was released on an LP album upon its original release in September 1971, with five songs on the A-side of the record and six songs on the B-side of the record. The record received three out of five stars by AllMusic.

Release
Treat Him Right included the four singles Barbara Mandrell released between 1969 and early 1971. The debut single was Mandrell's cover version of "I've Been Loving You Too Long (To Stop Now)", released in May 1969. The single only peaked at #55 on the Billboard Magazine Hot Country Songs chart. The second single was released in April 1970 "Playin' Around with Love", which became her first major hit, reaching #18 on the Billboard Magazine Hot Country Songs chart. "Do Right Woman, Do Right Man" was the third single, reaching #17 on the Country Singles chart as well as hitting the Bubbling Under Hot 100. The final single was the title track, which became her biggest solo hit to that point, reaching #12 on the Hot Country Songs list. Treat Him Right was released on September 9, 1971 and peaked at #44 on the Billboard Magazine Top Country Albums chart, her first album to chart on that list.

Track listing

Personnel
 Harold Bradley – guitar
 Kenneth Buttrey – drums
 Pete Drake – steel guitar, dobro
 Lloyd Green – steel guitar, dobro
 Buddy Harman – drums
 The Jordanaires – background vocals
 Barbara Mandrell – lead vocals
 Grady Martin – guitar
 Bob Moore – bass
 Hargus "Pig" Robbins – piano
 Billy Sanford – guitar
 Buddy Spicher – fiddle
 Chip Young – guitar

Charts

Weekly charts

Singles

References

1971 debut albums
Barbara Mandrell albums
Albums produced by Billy Sherrill
Columbia Records albums